Anthony Patrick McParland (born 20 September 1982) is a Scottish footballer, who played for Irvine Meadow in the Scottish Junior Football Association, West Region. He has previously played senior league football in England and Scotland.

McParland can play as a defender or as a midfielder, although he started out as a winger. McParland is a former Scotland under 17, 18 and 21 international player.

Career
McParland started his career as a youth player with Celtic from 2003 until 2006, playing as a winger. McParland failed to break into the first team during his time at Celtic Park. In the January 2006 transfer window McParland signed for Barnsley where he made 8 league appearances as a substitute without scoring a goal. In the 2007 January transfer window McParland signed for Wycombe Wanderers, initially on loan, before signing a permanent contract in February 2007. McParland made 4 league appearances for the club without scoring a goal, before being released at the end of the 2007–08 season.

McParland signed for Livingston on a two-year deal at the start of the 2008–09 season. McParland was then released by the club on 20 November 2009, having his contract terminated after he failed to break into the Livingston first team during the 2009–10 season. McParland made 40 league appearances for the Almondvale club and scored 3 goals.

On 12 December 2009 McParland was an unused trialist in a league match at Cappielow against Morton that Queens won 2–1. On 26 December 2009 McParland appeared as a trialist in a league match at Firhill against Partick Thistle that ended in a 2–2 draw. McParland replaced Willie McLaren in the second half after 68 minutes. In the January 2010 transfer window, McParland signed for Queen of the South. McParland's first match as a signed player was on 16 February 2010 at Palmerston in a league match against Ayr United that ended in a 3–0 win for Queens. McParland replaced David Weatherston in the second half after 72 minutes. He also played in two matches against Airdrie United but was released by Queens at the end of the 2009–10 season.

McParland moved to Junior football with Arthurlie after leaving Queen of the South but returned to the SPFL with Queen's Park in 2012. He returned to the Junior game with Irvine Meadow in July 2014.

He went on to have spells at Kirkintilloch Rob Roy, Glenafton Athletic and St Cadoc's before retiring in 2022.

References

External links

1982 births
Living people
Barnsley F.C. players
Celtic F.C. players
Scottish footballers
Wycombe Wanderers F.C. players
Livingston F.C. players
Queen of the South F.C. players
Arthurlie F.C. players
Queen's Park F.C. players
Irvine Meadow XI F.C. players
Kirkintilloch Rob Roy F.C. players
Glenafton Athletic F.C. players
Scotland under-21 international footballers
Scottish Football League players
English Football League players
Scottish Junior Football Association players
Sportspeople from Rutherglen
Association football defenders
Association football midfielders
Footballers from South Lanarkshire